Xystrologa is a genus of moths belonging to the family Tineidae.

Species
Xystrologa antipathetica (Forbes, 1931)
Xystrologa fulvicolor Meyrick, 1919
Xystrologa grenadella (Walsingham, 1897)
Xystrologa invidiosa Meyrick, 1919
Xystrologa lactirivis (Meyrick, 1932)
Xystrologa nigrovitta (Walsingham, 1897)
Xystrologa sympathetica (Meyrick, 1922)

References

Tineidae
Tineidae genera
Taxa named by Edward Meyrick